The Eight Immortals of the Wine Cup or Eight Immortals Indulged in Wine were a group of Tang Dynasty scholars who are known for their love of alcoholic beverages. They are not deified and xiān ("immortal; transcendent; fairy") is metaphorical. The term is used in a poem by Du Fu, as well as in the biography of Li Bai in the New Book of Tang.

They appeared in Du's poem in the following order:

 He Zhizhang (賀知章 Hè Zhīzhāng)
 Li Jin (李璡 Lǐ Jìn)
 Li Shizhi (李適之 Lǐ Shìzhi)
 Cui Zongzhi (崔宗之 Cuī Zōngzhī)
 Su Jin (蘇晉 Sū Jìn)
 Li Bai (李白 Lǐ Bái)
 Zhang Xu (張旭 Zhāng Xù)
 Jiao Sui (焦遂 Jiaō Suì)

See also

Chinese alcoholic beverage

External links
Pieter Eijkhoff, Wine In China Its History And Contemporary Developments

8 Eight Immortals of the Wine Cup
Articles about multiple people in pre-Tang China
Tang dynasty poets
Chinese alcoholic drinks
Octets